is a former Japanese football player.

Playing career
Sato was born in Shiwa, Iwate on December 22, 1975. He joined Regional Leagues club Nippon Denso (later Denso) from Verdy Kawasaki youth team in 1994. The club was promoted to Japan Football League (JFL) from 1997. In 1998, he moved to JFL club Sagan Tosu. He played as forward and offensive midfielder and the club was promoted to new league J2 League from 1999. Although he played many matches for a long time, his opportunity to play decreased in 2005. In 2006, he moved to Regional Leagues club Grulla Morioka based in his local Iwate Prefecture. He played for the club in 1 season and retired end of 2006 season.

Club statistics

References

External links

1975 births
Living people
Association football people from Iwate Prefecture
Japanese footballers
J2 League players
Japan Football League (1992–1998) players
FC Kariya players
Sagan Tosu players
Iwate Grulla Morioka players
Association football forwards